Delta Waterfowl Foundation is a non-profit organization operating in both Canada and in the United States whose mission is to secure the future of waterfowl and waterfowl hunting. Charity Navigator has ranked it among the top 10 conservation groups promoting the protection of wildlife and game lands for hunters and fishermen.

History 

In the 1930s James Ford Bell, sportsman and founder of General Mills, purchased 5,000 acres (20 km²) of the Delta Marsh in Manitoba, Canada.  For several years, Bell hunted waterfowl on the marsh in the fall and raised and released birds in the spring and summer from a privately owned hatchery.

In 1938, Bell approached Aldo Leopold, who is considered to be the father of wildlife management in the United States, about establishing a research station dedicated to waterfowl research at the Delta Marsh, as very little was known at that time about waterfowl biology.  After some discussion, Aldo Leopold agreed to Bell's idea and brought in his graduate student, Hans Albert Hochbaum, from the University of Wisconsin–Madison. Together they pioneered the study of breeding duck ecology and laid the foundation for much of the habitat research still being used today.

Today 

Delta Waterfowl Foundation has four mission pillars:

 Duck Production
 Habitat Conservation
 Research
 HunteR3

Delta Waterfowl supports graduate research on waterfowl, along with other programs that impact waterfowl populations and waterfowl hunting in North America. Their mission supports campus outreach experiences to inform students of the key roles hunters play in environmental sciences, wildlife management and conservation. 

 University Hunt programs
 First Hunt program

See also 

 Waterfowl hunting
 Ducks Unlimited
 Game bird
 Hunting
 Waterfowl
 Wetland
 Wildfowl and Wetlands Trust

References

External links 

 Delta Waterfowl Foundation

Environmental organizations based in Manitoba
Non-profit organizations based in Manitoba
Hunting in the United States
Water organizations in the United States
Hunting in Canada
Nature conservation organizations based in Canada
Ornithological organizations
Wetlands organizations
Wetland conservation in the United States
Organizations established in 1911
1911 establishments in Canada
Waterfowl
Organizations based in Winnipeg
Nature conservation organizations based in the United States
Non-profit organizations based in North Dakota